Themmangu Paattukaaran is a 1997 Indian Tamil-language film,  directed by Gangai Amaran and produced by Rajkiran. The film stars Ramarajan, Aamani, Goundamani and Senthil.

Cast 
Ramarajan
Aamani
Goundamani
Senthil

Soundtrack 
Soundtrack was composed by Ilaiyaraaja.

References

1997 films
Films scored by Ilaiyaraaja
1990s Tamil-language films
Films directed by Gangai Amaran